TAT-12/13 is a ring cable system consisting of the 12th and 13th consortia transatlantic telephone cables, in operation from 1996, initially carrying 2 × 5 Gbit/s.

This was the first TAT cable to use a ring structure, involving two stretches of cable across the ocean floor, which explains why two numbers (12 and 13) were used. All later cables also use a ring structure, but only use one number (TAT-14 etc.). The cable connected between Long Island (at Shirley, New York), USA; Green Hill, Rhode Island, USA; Porthcurno, UK; Bude, UK; and Penmarch, France.

The cable was constructed for US$740 million and was supplied jointly by AT&T Submarine Systems, Inc (now TE Subcom owned by TE Connectivity), STC Submarine Systems (acquired by Alcatel-Lucent) and Alcatel Submarcom. Ring switching equipment was provided by the Toshiba Corporation in each of the four cable stations.

The cables in this system were the first on the trans-Atlantic route to make use of erbium-doped fiber amplifiers.

The TAT-12/13 consortia removed the cable from normal commercial service on 31 December 2008.

Footnotes

Sources
 

Infrastructure completed in 1996
Transatlantic communications cables
France–United Kingdom relations
France–United States relations
United Kingdom–United States relations
1996 establishments in England
1996 establishments in France
1996 establishments in New York (state)
1996 establishments in Rhode Island